The 1500 metres at the Summer Olympics has been contested since the first edition of the multi-sport event. The men's 1500 m has been present on the Olympic athletics programme since 1896. The women's event was not introduced until over seventy years later, but it has been a permanent fixture since it was first held in 1972. The Olympics final and the World Athletics Championships final are the most prestigious 1500 m races at an elite level. The competition format comprises three rounds: a heats stage, semi-finals, then a final typically between twelve athletes.

The 1500 meters was one of four individual events documented exclusively by Olympic documentary filmmaker Bud Greenspan.

The Olympic records for the event are 3:28.32 minutes for men, set by Jakob Ingebrigtsen in 2021, and 3:53.11 minutes for women, set by Faith Kipyegon in 2021. The 1500 metres world record has been broken several times at the Olympics: the men's record was beaten in 1900, 1936, and 1960, while the women's record was improved in 1972 (three times) and in 1980.

Only three athletes have defended the Olympic 1500 m title: Tatyana Kazankina became the first person to win two gold medals in the event in 1980 (repeating her 1976 win) and, soon after, Sebastian Coe became the first man to do so in 1980 and 1984. Faith Kipyegon is the latest athlete to accomplish the feat, by following up her gold medal in 2016 with another at Tokyo 2020. No athlete of either sex has won more than two medals. Historically, athletes in this event have also had success in the 800 metres at the Olympics. Kelly Holmes was the last athlete to win both events at the same Olympics in 2004.  2012 1500m gold medalist Taoufik Makhloufi made both podiums without winning gold in 2016.

Kenya is the most successful nation in the event, having won seven gold medals. Great Britain has the next highest number of gold medals, with six. The United States is the only nation to have swept the medals in the event, having done so in St. Louis in 1904, albeit in a final between seven Americans and two foreigners.

Medal summary

Men

Multiple medalists

Medals by country

 The German total includes teams both competing as Germany and the United Team of Germany, but not East or West Germany.

Women

Multiple medalists

Medalists by country

Intercalated Games
The 1906 Intercalated Games were held in Athens and at the time were officially recognised as part of the Olympic Games series, with the intention being to hold a games in Greece in two-year intervals between the internationally held Olympics. However, this plan never came to fruition and the International Olympic Committee (IOC) later decided not to recognise these games as part of the official Olympic series. Some sports historians continue to treat the results of these games as part of the Olympic canon.

At this event a men's 1500 m was held and the reigning 800 metres and 1500 m champion from the 1904 Olympics, James Lightbody, was the winner. Two 1908 Olympic participants, Britain's John McGough and Sweden's Kristian Hellström were the silver and bronze medalists.

References
Participation and athlete data
Athletics Men's 1500 metres Medalists. Sports Reference. Retrieved on 2014-02-07.
Athletics Women's 1500 metres Medalists. Sports Reference. Retrieved on 2014-02-07.
Olympic record progressions
Mallon, Bill (2012). TRACK & FIELD ATHLETICS - OLYMPIC RECORD PROGRESSIONS. Track and Field News. Retrieved on 2014-02-07.
Specific

External links
IAAF 1500 metres homepage
Official Olympics website
Olympic athletics records from Track & Field News

 
Olympics
1500 metres